The Yamaha DragStar 650 (also known as the V Star 650 and the XVS650/XVS650A) is a motorcycle produced by Yamaha Motor Company.

Background 

Based on the Yamaha Virago 535 engine, the XVS650 (named V Star in USA & Australia) cylinders were bored an additional 5 mm to 81 mm and stroked 4 mm more to 63 mm, to net a displacement of 649 cc.

The Yamaha XVS650 is sold in the U.S. as the entry-level versions of the V-Star line.  That line was offered from 1998 to 2008 in two different versions:  the Classic and the Silverado.  Both versions are built around the same 649 cc v-twin engine.  The V-Star line offers the visual appeal of larger v-twin motorcycles paired with the fuel efficiency, reliability, and nimble handling of a mid-size cruiser.

V-star 
The V-Star 650 (and even the 1100) bikes come in three trims:

V-Star Custom (650) XVS650 - Base version for long-distance cruising. It was equipped with plastic front & rear fenders, and incorporated a recessed taillight under the flared rear fender. This model also came in a special Midnight Custom version with blacked-out trim. The Midnight Custom (XVS65Y-B) was painted in Raven (black metallic), including black wheel rims and black satin trim throughout. Chrome accents and pipes complimented the monochromatic color scheme.
V-Star Classic (650) XVS650A - The same frame as the V-star Custom but with wider front wheel, metal fenders, longer bodywork, less chromed styling, dragged handlebars, wider seat and numerous styling differences.
V-Star Silverado (650) - Much as the V-Star Classic with saddlebags and a few other touring additions
Some V-Star motorcycles come in what others may know as deepish purple with flames. There were 2 editions made of this. The XVS65T-F and the XVS65TC-F (CA edition). CA edition is for California Only and is equipped with a canister to prevent the discharging of fuel vapor into the atmosphere. There are 3 lines to this canister. One to the fuel tank, one to the carburetor and a vent hose. Both of these models when the VIN is decoded will show up either XVS650 and XVS650A mostly because their parts are identical to these 2 models with very few exceptions if any.

All these are the base versions of the RoadStar. The RoadStar and RoyalStar generally refers to the class of bikes which are made and fine-tuned for touring performance.

2009 
There were no spec changes between 2008 and 2009 models.
V-Star Classic available from June 2008
V-Star Custom available from June 2008; CA model from August 2008
V-Star Silverado available from June 2008

2008 
V-Star Classic available from September 2007
V-Star Custom available from September 2007
V-Star Silverado available from March 2008

See also 
Star Motorcycles full range
 Yamaha DragStar 1100 - XVS1100/XVS1100A

References

External links 
Yamaha Motor Co. global site
 Grupo de proprietários:https://chat.whatsapp.com/J6p8dv0PMX1IMQsEGjMRxO

DragStar 650
Cruiser motorcycles
Motorcycles introduced in 1997
Shaft drive motorcycles